Alison Gail Ramsay (born 16 April 1959) is a former Scottish field hockey player, who was a member of the Great Britain and Northern Ireland squad that won the bronze medal at the 1992 Summer Olympics in Barcelona. She is one of the world's most capped women's hockey players, with over 250 appearances for Scotland and Great Britain and Northern Ireland, and received the MBE.

Ramsay enjoyed a thirteen-year international career before her retirement in 1995. She still plays for Bonagrass Grove at club level and works as a solicitor. Ramsay received the prestigious MacRobert Thistle Award in 1995 for her achievements and she remains one of the most respected hockey players to have come out of Scotland.

External links
 
 
 
 

1959 births
Living people
Scottish female field hockey players
Scottish solicitors
Olympic field hockey players of Great Britain
British female field hockey players
Field hockey players at the 1988 Summer Olympics
Field hockey players at the 1992 Summer Olympics
Sportspeople from London
Olympic medalists in field hockey
Scottish Olympic medallists
Medalists at the 1992 Summer Olympics
Olympic bronze medallists for Great Britain
Members of the Order of the British Empire